Murray Darling is  a wine region and Australian Geographical Indication which spans the Murray River and its confluence with the Darling River in northwestern Victoria and southwestern New South Wales. It was registered as a protected name on 16 June 1997.

Murray Darling is the second-largest wine region in Australia. Vines were first planted there in 1888, around the time that irrigation schemes made it possible to grow fruit in the otherwise arid landscape through which this part of the Murray River flows.

Key towns in the region are Mildura, Merbein, Robinvale in Victoria and Balranald, Euston and Wentworth in New South Wales.

References

wine regions of New South Wales
Wine regions of Victoria (Australia)